Barolineocerus spinosus is a species of leafhopper native to the Colombian Amazon. It is named for the unusual inner spine on the male subgenital plate. It is distinguished from other species in the genus by the subgenital plate. Only the male of the species has been described as of 2008.

References 

Hemiptera of South America
Arthropods of Colombia
Endemic fauna of Colombia
Fauna of the Amazon
Insects described in 2008
Eurymelinae